An Bun Beag (anglicised as Bunbeg), meaning "the small river mouth", is a small Gaeltacht village and townland in County Donegal, Ireland. It is officially the smallest townland in Gaoth Dobhair (Gweedore), but today the name Bunbeg is used to describe a large region of the parish. It is situated between Derrybeg and the townland of Dore and is home to many of Gweedore's amenities and businesses. The Clady River (Irish: An Chláidigh) flows into the Crolly River (also known as the Gweedore River) beside Bunbeg Quay, on the south-western outskirts of Bunbeg.

There is a ferry service from Bunbeg to nearby Tory Island.

Storm
On Tuesday, 23 June 2009, a severe thunderstorm struck Gweedore and the adjoining villages of Bunbeg and Derrybeg. It lasted for several hours and caused two rivers to burst their banks, flooding houses and businesses, and damaging roads and bridges. Lightning strikes damaged power lines and mobile phone services, causing those trapped by the floods to be unable to communicate. Described as the worst storm 'in living memory', it was also the most severe since 1880 when 5 people drowned in Derrybeg.

Appearances in music 

Bunbeg is mentioned in the song "Left in Peace" from the album Finisterres (1997) by Héritage des Celtes.

References

External links 

Gaeltacht places in County Donegal
Gaeltacht towns and villages
Geography of Gweedore
Towns and villages in County Donegal